Memed My Hawk is a 1984 British-Yugoslav drama film directed by Peter Ustinov (the final film he directed) and starring Ustinov, Herbert Lom, Denis Quilley and Michael Elphick. It is an adaptation of the 1955 Turkish novel Memed, My Hawk by Yaşar Kemal,  cinematographer Freddie Francis. Music Manos Hadjidakis, producer Fuad Kavur.

Plot
In 1920s Turkey, Memed, a young peasant, is smitten with a beautiful young girl, who has been promised in marriage to the fat, dullard cousin of the province's powerful and corrupt governor.

Partial cast
 Peter Ustinov – Abdi Aga
 Herbert Lom – Ali Safa Bey
 Denis Quilley – Recep
 Michael Elphick – Cabbar
 Simon Dutton – Memed
 Leonie Mellinger – Hatche
 Siobhán McKenna – Iroz
 Marne Maitland – Süleyman
 Michael Gough – Kerimoglu
 T. P. McKenna – Dursan
 Jeffry Wickham – Captain Faruk

Background
Memed, My Hawk is the first novel written by the Turkish novelist Yaşar Kemal. As soon as it was published, it also appeared in an English translation, and Kemal was nominated for the Nobel prize for literature. Twentieth Century Fox, then led by Darryl F. Zanuck, acquired the film rights to the book. Zanuck announced that Fox was going to turn Memed into an epic motion picture. The cast included Peter Ustinov as Abdi Aga. However, the Turkish government of the day asked the US State Department to intervene so that Fox would drop the project. The reason behind this was the Turkish government's belief that Memed My Hawk was Communist propaganda. Fox obliged, and the project was dropped.

It was not until 1982 that the project was revived, due to Fuad Kavur, an opera stage director, who was working as an assistant to Ustinov. Kavur asked Ustinov if he would be interested in reprising the part in Memed, that of the ruthless Turkish landlord, "Abdi Agha", in the aborted Zannuck production. When Ustinov agreed, Kavur bought back the film rights from Twentieth Century Fox. Soon thereafter, he was able to raise the finance for the movie in Turkey, and the preparations for filming started. Kavur visited the then prime minister of Turkey, Bülent Ecevit, to make sure that the permission to film in Turkey would not be withheld. Ecevit, a socialist, assured Kavur that there would be no problems, though as a formality, Ustinov's screenplay had to be submitted to the Turkish Film Censorship Committee. However, the Censorship Committee refused to grant permission, and  Ecevit reacted to this decision, by promptly dismissing the Committee. This became headline news in Turkey, as it represented a confrontation between Ecevit and the military controlled Censorship Committee. Ecevit, who led a minority government, lost a vote of confidence in the parliament, and he and his cabinet fell. The incoming administration, led by Süleyman Demirel, which was a right-wing party, upheld the decision of the (sacked) Censorship Committee, and the permission to film Memed My Hawk was once more denied.

Kavur, the producer of Memed, had to move the production in a hurry to Yugoslavia. There was no government interference there, and the film was made with no further political problems

Memed My Hawk had a Royal Gala Premiere in London in May 1984, in aid of UNICEF. The event was attended by Prince and Princess Michael of Kent, and some thirty ambassadors in London; however, except the Turkish ambassador who declined  due to a "previous engagement".  Simultaneously, the Turkish government announced that the exhibition of Memed My Hawk in Turkey was banned.   Soon afterwards, Fuad Kavur, the producer of the film, renounced his Turkish citizenship, in protest of the oppressive policies of the Ankara government.

As of 2012, the exhibition in movie theatres, and/or broadcasting of it on television, or the sale of it as DVD, remained banned.

References
1.      IMdB

External links

1984 drama films
1984 films
Films based on Turkish novels
Films directed by Peter Ustinov
British drama films
Films scored by Manos Hatzidakis
1980s English-language films
1980s British films